Sherman Drakeley Stearns (December 27, 1899 – January 11, 1965) was an American contract bridge player from New York and a member of the championship Four Aces team.

A real estate broker, Stearns was born in Illinois but later moved to New York City, where he died in 1965.

Bridge accomplishments

Wins

 North American Bridge Championships (5)
 von Zedtwitz Life Master Pairs (1) 1938 
 Vanderbilt (4) 1935, 1937, 1938, 1941

Runners-up

 North American Bridge Championships
 Vanderbilt (1) 1931 
 Spingold (1) 1934 
 Chicago Mixed Board-a-Match (1) 1941 
 Reisinger (1) 1934

See also
 Four Aces

References

External links

1899 births
1965 deaths
American contract bridge players
Sportspeople from New York City
People from Illinois